Japanese band Tokyo Jihen (2004–2012) recorded material for five studio albums and one extended play, including songs for several compilation albums and singles. The band formed after Japanese singer-songwriter Ringo Sheena formed a band in 2004, but first collaborated with the members in 2003, performing with her on her Sugoroku Ecstasy tour. The original line-up included bassist and producer Seiji Kameda, drummer Toshiki Hata, Jazz band Pe'z pianist Masayuki Hiizumi and guitarist Mikio Hirama.

After the band's debut album Kyōiku (2004), Hiizumi and Hirama left the band's line-up, and in 2005 were replaced by Appa pianist Ichiyo Izawa and guitarist Ukigumo, previous Sheena collaborator and member of the band Petrolz. This line-up remained consistent until Tokyo Jihen's break-up in 2012.

While Sheena acted as the primary songwriter, the band performed songs written by all the band members. Variety (2007) was an album that primarily featured songs composed by Izawa and Ukigumo, and Color Bars (2012) featured five songs, one written by each band member.

The band covered several Ringo Sheena songs, most notably "Ringo no Uta" on Kyōiku (2004), and "Marunouchi Sadistic," which was the most performed song by Tokyo Jihen at concerts, including their own compositions.

This list features every song Tokyo Jihen has performed as a unit that has been released either on CD, as a digital download or on a live concert DVD. Titles were given Japanese song titles, as well as a title in English or French. Titles listed on the left are literal translations of the songs' Japanese titles.

Songs

Unreleased songs

Notes

References

Tokyo Jihen